Ocean Mall, is a  skyscraper in the Clifton locality of Karachi, Pakistan. It was built between 2009 and 2014, and contains a shopping mall and office spaces.

Founded as an international hotel project for Sofitel, but was later abandoned due to law and order situation in the city. Later, it was redesigned into a shopping mall and was named The Mall.

Structural information

Ocean Tower is a  skyscraper in Karachi. It contains 28 storeys above ground, and 5 below ground. The project has its own 5-megawatt powerhouse, as compared with the 2 MW- and 1.2 MW-capacity powerhouses of MCB Tower and the Arif Habib Building respectively, and it does not rely on K-Electric for power. The tower uses state-of-the-art technology for monitoring heat and smoke. It has nine passenger lifts and five cargo lifts.

Surface Area of the project is 850,000 sq.ft. Construction cost is Rs. 5 billion. The Project Architect is arcop Private Limited.

See also 
 List of tallest buildings in Pakistan
 List of tallest buildings in Karachi

References

External links
 

Towers in Karachi
Skyscrapers in Karachi
Office buildings in Karachi
Skyscraper office buildings
Skyscrapers in Sindh
Skyscrapers in Pakistan